Cooklaw is a small settlement and (as Cocklaw) a former civil parish, now in the parish of Wall, in Northumberland, England. It is near the A6079 road and the River North Tyne. In 1951 the parish had a population of 119.

Governance 
Cooklaw is in the parliamentary constituency of Hexham. Cocklaw was formerly a township in St. John-Lee parish, from 1866 Cocklaw was a civil parish in its own right until it was abolished on 1 April 1955 and merged with Wall.

References

Villages in Northumberland
Cocklaw
Wall, Northumberland